is a passenger railway station in located in the city of Wakayama, Wakayama Prefecture, Japan, operated by West Japan Railway Company (JR West).

Lines

Station layout
The station consists of two island platforms connected to the station building by a footbridge. The station has a Midori no Madoguchi staffed ticket office.

Platforms

Adjacent stations

|-
!colspan=5|JR West

History
Kii Station opened on 16 June 1930. With the privatization of the Japan National Railways (JNR) on 1 April 1987, the station came under the aegis of the West Japan Railway Company.

Station numbering was introduced in March 2018 with Kii being assigned station number JR-R51.

Passenger statistics
In fiscal 2019, the station was used by an average of 3882 passengers daily (boarding passengers only).

Surrounding Area
 Wakayama City Kii Elementary School
 Wakayama City Kii Junior High School
 Wakayama Prefectural Kii Cosmos Support School
 Ueno temple ruins

See also
List of railway stations in Japan

References

External links

 Kii Station Official Site

Railway stations in Wakayama Prefecture
Railway stations in Japan opened in 1930
Wakayama (city)